Nigel Bates is a fictional character from the BBC soap opera EastEnders, played by Paul Bradley from 1992 to 1998. Introduced in 1992 by Leonard Lewis, the character was incorporated gradually and brought back as a regular following a brief stint due to a popular reception. He is depicted as a lovable loser and a nerd. Bradley quit the role and Nigel was written out of the serial in April 1998 and was given a happy ending. The door was left open for a possible future return.

Storylines
Nigel attended school with Phil and Grant Mitchell (Steve McFadden and Ross Kemp) and starts frequenting the Mitchells' home town of Walford in 1992, before finally moving there himself following the death of his mother later that year. He lodges with Dot Cotton (June Brown) and is known in the community for his extravagant shirts and ties, and his mop of shaggy curly hair. Dot comes to think of Nigel as the son she never had because he is the complete opposite of her own son Nick (John Altman). This causes trouble between Nigel and Nick when Nick bullies Nigel, jealous of Dot's friendship with him.

In 1993, he falls in love with Debbie Tyler (Nicola Duffett). Debbie is estranged from her abusive husband, Liam (Francis Magee); however, Liam returns in 1993 to reunite with Debbie and visit their young daughter Clare (Gemma Bissix). He reacts with fury when he realises Nigel is seeing Debbie and bullies both in an attempt to split them up. Eventually, Liam is frightened away by Grant. Nigel and Debbie marry in 1994 and are happy until 1995, when Debbie is killed in a hit and run accident. Nigel is devastated for some time. Liam returns and fights Nigel for custody of Clare but is unsuccessful because of his history of violent behaviour towards Debbie and his current girlfriend  Caroline Webber (Franesca Hall) admitting that Liam has been abusive toward her; Nigel legally adopts Claire after being awarded custody.

Following a long period of mourning, Nigel grows close to Lorraine Wicks (Jacqueline Leonard) and attempts to ignite a relationship. This goes awry as Lorraine does not return Nigel's romantic feelings and is instead attracted to Grant, which deeply hurts Nigel. In 1997, he meets Julie Haye (Karen Henthorn), Clare's school teacher, who occasionally dropped into Nigel's video shop to rent French films. Their friendship blossoms into romance but Nigel remains reticent believing he is tarnishing Debbie's honour. He almost loses Julie after she announces she is moving to Scotland, but on the night of her departure, Nigel sees sense and pledges his love for Julie and in April 1998, he and Clare leave Walford for Scotland to be with Julie and her son, Josh Saunders (Jon Lee).

Dot occasionally visits Nigel off-screen. Clare returns to Walford in February 2008 to stay with Dot. Nigel is meant to visit her in July 2008, but does not arrive. This upsets Clare and she confides in Bradley Branning (Charlie Clements) that her and Nigel's relationship had become strained in her time away from Walford. According to Clare, Nigel had transferred his affections to Julie's son Josh as he struggled to cope with Clare's teenage dalliances. In October 2009, Pat reveals that Nigel had suffered a heart attack and Dot goes to visit him.

Creation and development
Nigel was one of several introductions occurring in 1992. Executive producer Leonard Lewis took a tentative approach to introducing new characters in 1992. Most were introduced gradually, making an initial appearance and then joining the programme full-time a couple of months later. This allowed the producers and writers to create new characters and see them brought to life by the actors before committing them to a longer contract. Characters introduced in this way included Mandy Salter (Nicola Stapleton), Christine Hewitt (Lizzie Power) and Nigel Bates, played by Paul Bradley.

Nigel first appears in March 1992 as a friend of established characters Grant (Ross Kemp) and Phil Mitchell (Steve McFadden), when he comes to Walford and buys Frank Butcher's (Mike Reid) Mercedes. After a successful first appearance, Nigel moves to the soap's setting permanently later in the year following the death of his mother and became the lodger of Dot Cotton (June Brown).

Paul Bradley has discussed his casting in Larry Jaffee's book, Albert Square & Me: The Actors of Eastenders, conducted in 1994: "I was only supposed to do three episodes and I think they just liked the character. Nigel is kind of light and funny and arrived just after Gill [Fowler] (Susanna Dawson) had died of AIDS and the show was accused of being a bit gloomy. I came back for one more episode and then I've been back ever since."

Bradley has described Nigel as "harmless and amiable ... I suppose he's a bit of a wallie. Nigel is very well-meaning. He was best mates at school with Phil and Grant. Where they would use their fists, he would use jokes to get out of trouble." Author Kate Lock has described him as "a lovely, lovely man with two flaws: his inability to say 'no' to a fry-up and his faith in Grant Mitchell." Lock suggested that Nigel and Grant were diametrically opposed personalities. Lock added, "Nigel was overweight, shy, had the world's worst taste in shirts and ties and sported a mop of shaggy curls reminiscent of 70s footballers, so it wasn't often he found success with the opposite sex, although women were drawn to his gentleness and humour more than he realised." Author Rupert Smith classified Nigel as a "soft touch" character, the type of characters who were " confused, sexually bungling men [...] These poor souls exist to be trampled, disappointed and taken for a ride by any crook or schemer that crosses their path."<ref name="20years">{{cite book |last= Smith|first= Rupert|title= EastEnders: 20 years in Albert Square |year=2005|publisher=BBC books|isbn=978-0-563-52165-5|title-link= EastEnders spin-offs#Non-fiction books}}</ref>

In 1993, two characters central to Nigel's narrative are introduced: A love-interest Debbie Tyler (Nicola Duffett) and her daughter Clare (Gemma Bissix). Their introduction stems around a storyline focusing on spousal abuse, when it is revealed that Debbie is being abused by her estranged husband Liam Tyler (Francis Magee). Nigel and Debbie's eventual marriage is the focus of EastEnders' celebratory episode on 12 July 1994, which marked the show's 1000th episode. EastEnders' writer Colin Brake has selected it as 1994's episode of the year. Off-screen the show's Series Producer Barbara Emile decided to mark the 1000th episode with a celebration and the wedding of Nigel and Debbie was chosen as the event. It was scripted to be a happy occasion in the soap, with Debbie and Nigel's ceremony going ahead despite threats of intrusion from Liam. The Bateses happiness was short-lived on-screen, as in 1995, Debbie's actress Nicola Duffet requested to be written out of the soap; Debbie was killed off in the serial leaving Nigel a grieving widower, fighting for custody of his step daughter, Clare.

In December 1996, it was announced that Bradley decided to quit EastEnders for fear of being typecast as a nerd and "lovable loser". He was the third senior cast member to quit in as space of two months, following the announced departures of Jacqueline Leonard and Paul Nicholls who played Lorraine and Joe Wicks. Bradley said, "I have made a decision about leaving EastEnders and I have told the BBC about it. I know it is regular work and you are in the public eye, but it is time to move on. Much as I love playing Nigel, I would not like people to think that was all I did. I did a lot of work before EastEnders and I will after. I don't want to be like some people who've been in [ITV soap opera] Coronation Street for 20 years - I'm much too restless." A BBC insider commented, "It's a real blow that Paul wants to go, but we hope that he doesn't close the door altogether. It's very worrying that so much of the top talent is wanting out of Albert Square."

The character remains on-screen until April 1998 and was given a "happy ending", leaving to begin a new life with a newfound love Julie Haye (Karen Henthorn), allowing for a future return. Henthorn has suggested that because Nigel was "such a popular character", and because he had such an unsuccessful love life throughout the course of the show, the producers of EastEnders'' felt that the viewing public would not want him to have anything other than a "happy ending".

References

External links
 

EastEnders characters
Television characters introduced in 1992
Male characters in television
Fictional shopkeepers